Handforth railway station is in the town of Handforth in Cheshire, England. Opened in 1842, it is on the Crewe to Manchester Line.

History
The station opened on 10 May 1842. Since opening, the station has served commuters to Manchester. Since electrification of the line in 1960, trains through the station have been mainly electric multiple units (EMU).

Services
The evening service operates hourly between Crewe and Manchester.

On Sundays there is an hourly service to both Manchester and to Crewe.

Friends of Handforth Station

The Friends of Handforth Station, formed in 1996, are an active station adoption group who have carried out a number of projects at the station, including a station garden, sculptures, poetry and signs from railway operators in other countries.

The group works towards securing easier platform access for disabled passengers and those with prams, bikes etc.

References

Further reading

External links

 Crewe-Manchester Community Rail Partnership
 Friends of Handforth Station

Railway stations in Cheshire
DfT Category E stations
Former London and North Western Railway stations
Railway stations in Great Britain opened in 1842
Northern franchise railway stations
1842 establishments in England